Graneros is a Chilean commune and city in Cachapoal Province, O'Higgins Region.

Deportes
Graneros se conoce como unas de las candidatas a ganar la copa de la región Libertador Bernardo Ohiggins
Tiene su Estadio renovado,El Estadio Miguel Riffo Leon,o Más conocido como el Municipal de graneros o más conocido como el Matador De Graneros

Apodos
Los granerinos

Administration
As a commune, Graneros is a third-level administrative division of Chile administered by a municipal council, headed by an alcalde who is directly elected every four years. The 2008-2012 alcalde is Juan Pablo Díaz Burgos. The council has the following members:
 Juan Carlos Reyes
 Antonio Pereira
 Miguel Gutierrez L.
 Carlos Ortega
 Raquel Campos
 Ximena Jeldres

Within the electoral divisions of Chile, Graneros is represented in the Chamber of Deputies by Eugenio Bauer (UDI) and Ricardo Rincón  (PDC) as part of the 33rd electoral district, together with Mostazal, Codegua, Machalí, Requínoa, Rengo, Olivar, Doñihue, Coinco, Coltauco, Quinta de Tilcoco and Malloa. The commune is represented in the Senate by Andrés Chadwick Piñera (UDI) and Juan Pablo Letelier Morel (PS) as part of the 9th senatorial constituency (O'Higgins Region).

References

External links
  Municipality of Graneros

Communes of Chile
Populated places in Cachapoal Province